Diongolo Traore (born 1914 in Bobo-Dioulasso, Burkina Faso, died April 18, 1971) was a Burkinabe politician who served in the French Senate from 1952–1958.

References
 Page on the French senate website

Burkinabé politicians
French Senators of the Fourth Republic
People from Bobo-Dioulasso
1914 births
1971 deaths
Senators of French West Africa